Red Brush is an unincorporated community in Surry County, North Carolina, United States.  The community is roughly centered on the junction of Interstate 74 and Red Brush Road.  Prominent landmarks include Meadowview Middle School.

References

External links
 Meadowview Middle School

Unincorporated communities in Surry County, North Carolina
Unincorporated communities in North Carolina